Uladzimir Ignatik won the first edition of this tournament. He defeated Alexandre Kudryavtsev 6–4, 6–4 in the final.

Seeds

Draw

Finals

Top half

Bottom half

References
Main Draw
Qualifying Singles

ATP Challenger Guangzhou - Singles
China International Guangzhou